Daniela Olivera (born 10 December 1980) is a Uruguayan retired tennis player.

Olivera won one single titles and seven doubles titles on the ITF Circuit. On 16 April 2001, she reached her best singles ranking of world number 222. On 3 December 2001, she peaked at world number 224 in the doubles rankings.

Playing for Uruguay in Fed Cup, Olivera has accumulated a win/loss record of 19–14.

ITF Circuit finals

Singles: 8 (1–7)

Doubles: 12 (7–5)

References

External links
 
 
 

1980 births
Living people
Sportspeople from Montevideo
Uruguayan female tennis players
20th-century Uruguayan women
21st-century Uruguayan women